A Border Crossing Card (BCC) is an identity document used by nationals of Mexico to enter the United States. As a standalone document, the BCC allows its holder to visit the border areas of the United States when entering by land or sea directly from Mexico for up to 30 days. The document also functions as a B1/B2 visa when presented with a valid Mexican passport, for entry to any part of the United States by any means of transportation.

History
Since 1953, Mexico and the United States have agreed to make special accommodations for Mexican nationals who cross the Mexico–United States border into the immediate area to promote the economic stability of the region. On November 12, 1953, the two countries entered into an agreement concerning the border area, which included a provision allowing Mexican nationals who resided near the border to be issued border-crossing identification cards. These cards could be used for multiple applications for admission during the validity of the card.

In 1982, the border zone that may be visited with a BCC was defined as the area within  from the border. In 2004, the allowed period of stay in the border zone with a BCC was expanded from 72 hours to 30 days.

Eligibility
The BCC is issued only to Mexican nationals residing in Mexico and by the U.S. diplomatic missions in Mexico. Applicants must satisfy the same requirements as for a B visa, including demonstrating their ties to Mexico that would compel them to return after a temporary stay in the United States.

Description
The first generation of machine-readable BCCs, known as "laser visas", was produced from April 1, 1998, until September 30, 2008. The laminated, credit card-size document is both a BCC and a B1/B2 visitor visa. The cards are valid for travel until the expiration date on the front of the card, usually ten years after issuance. They are nearly identical to the previous generation U.S. permanent resident card.

October 1, 2008, marked the beginning of production of a second generation B1/B2 visa/BCC. The new card is similar in size to the old BCC, but contains enhanced graphics and technology. The original BCC was produced by the now defunct Immigration and Naturalization Service but the current card is produced by the Department of State. It is virtually identical to the U.S. passport card, which is issued to nationals of the United States for the purposes of land and sea border crossings, in its general design layout. The card includes an RFID chip and integrated contactless circuit and is part of the same PASS system as the passport card.

Use
As a standalone document, the BCC allows its holder to visit the following border areas of the United States when entering by land or sea, for up to 30 days:
California within  of the border
Arizona within  of the border
New Mexico within  of the border or up to Interstate 10, whichever is further north
Texas within  of the border

When presented with a Mexican passport, the BCC functions as a B visa, accepted for entry to any part of the United States by any means of transportation.

See also
 B visa
 Enhanced driver's license
 NEXUS card
 United States Passport Card

References

External links
 Border Crossing Card
 What is a U.S. Visa?
 About Visas – The Basics

International travel documents